Laurie Silvera (born July 7, 1939, in Kingston, Jamaica) is a Canadian thoroughbred racehorse trainer. A resident of Guelph, Ontario, he has been training professionally since 1975 at racetracks in the Toronto area. He won three consecutive Spring training titles at Greenwood Raceway between 1989 and 1991.

On April 13, 2014, Silvera achieved his 1000th career win in North America, not to mention over 200 wins while residing in Jamaica.

His son, Arthur Silvera, is also a trainer based at Woodbine Racetrack.

References
 Laurie Silvera's biography at Woodbine Entertainment

1939 births
Living people
Canadian racehorse trainers
Canadian people of Jamaican descent
People from the Regional Municipality of Halton